Chak Atitha High School is a non-government funded co-educational secondary school in Chak Atitha, Naogaon Sadar Upazila, Naogaon District, Bangladesh. It was established in 1914.

Information 
Established in 1914, the 2 acre (0.8 ha) campus serves approximately 350 students from grades 6-10 (ages 12–17) with a teaching staff of 15, led by Principal Yasin Ahmed (2015 to present) and the Board of Intermediate and Secondary Education, Rajshahi. Facilities include a Faculty-Library, a student hostel, and a mosque. Sessions run from January to December, and coursework is conducted in the Bengali language.

The school's motto is "Knowledge Is Power" (জ্ঞানই শক্তি).

References

Schools in Naogaon District
High schools in Bangladesh
1914 establishments in India
Educational institutions established in 1914